Breno Gomes Giacomini (born September 27, 1985) is a former American football offensive tackle. He was drafted by the Green Bay Packers in the fifth round in the 2008 NFL Draft. He played college football at Louisville. Giacomini is of Brazilian descent. Along with Gary Barnidge of the Cleveland Browns, Giacomini founded American Football Without Barriers in 2011, a football-related charity foundation.

Early years
The son of two Brazilian expatriates from Governador Valadares, Giacomini was born in Cambridge, Massachusetts and raised in Malden. His interest in playing football begun as Giacomini was brought to meet New England Patriots quarterback Drew Bledsoe at the Boston Marriott, where his father worked. Giacomini was a three-year starter as a defensive end and outside linebacker at Malden  High School with Joe Morrisey. He started his freshman and sophomore years, but decided to not play football as a junior to concentrate on basketball, as he averaged 21.0 points per game as a senior and was second in the league in scoring. However, one of his high school football coaches convinced him to resume playing football for college. Despite taking an almost two year long absence from football in high school, Giacomini was rated as a 2-star recruit by 247 Sports and a 3-star recruit by Rivals coming out of high school. Giacomini ultimately committed to play for Louisville, which was the lone Division I-A college program to offer him a scholarship.

College career
Giacomini played college football at Louisville. While he had played on the defensive side of the ball in high school, the Louisville coaches were so impressed with his speed and catching ability they converted him to a tight end for his freshman and sophomore seasons.

When he reported to fall camp in 2006, he had grown from a 242-pound tight end to a 303-pound offensive tackle forcing the coaching staff to move him to the offensive line. He started two games his junior year when starter George Bussey was out with an injury.

During his senior season, Giacomini moved to starting right tackle. The team's ground game struggled, but he provided solid pass protection, allowing only four sacks and two pressures on 491 pass plays. He earned second-team All-Big East Conference honors.

Professional career

Green Bay Packers
Giacomini was drafted by the Green Bay Packers in the fifth round, 150th overall, in the 2008 NFL Draft. On July 23, he was signed to a four-year rookie contract with a signing bonus of $179,000.

Seattle Seahawks
Giacomini was acquired by the Seattle Seahawks from the Packers practice squad on September 28, 2010, and released on October 23, 2010. He was re-signed for the 2011 season, during which he played in 15 games and started 8. He started every game of the 2012 season, including both postseason games.

Giacomini started in 9 games during the 2013 season, missing 7 games (week 4-10) while recovering from knee surgery. Giacomini started all three post-season games for the Seahawks including their 43-8 Super Bowl win over the Denver Broncos in Super Bowl XLVIII.

New York Jets
Giacomini was signed by the New York Jets on March 12, 2014. He started every game of the 2014 and 2015 seasons.

Giacomini started the 2016 on the Reserve/PUP list due a back injury and missed the first seven games. He was activated to the active roster on October 29, 2016, prior to Week 8 of the 2016 season. He was placed on injured reserve on December 13, 2016, after re-injuring his back in Week 13.

On February 23, 2017, Giacomini was released by the Jets.

Houston Texans
On May 16, 2017, Giacomini signed with the Houston Texans.

Oakland Raiders
On March 22, 2018, Giacomini signed with the Oakland Raiders, reuniting with former Seahawks offensive line coach Tom Cable. He was released on August 27, 2018.

References

External links

 Official website
 New York Jets bio
 Seattle Seahawks bio
 Green Bay Packers bio

1985 births
Living people
Sportspeople from Malden, Massachusetts
Players of American football from Massachusetts
American sportspeople of Brazilian descent
American people of Italian descent
American football offensive tackles
Louisville Cardinals football players
Green Bay Packers players
Seattle Seahawks players
New York Jets players
Houston Texans players
Oakland Raiders players